Konarevka is a rural locality (a village) in Balzinya Selsoviet, Meleuzovsky District, Bashkortostan, Russia. The population was 29 as of 2019. There are 3 streets.

Geography 
Konarevka is located 24 km southwest of Meleuz (the district's administrative centre) by road. Maljahansino is the nearest rural locality.

References 

Rural localities in Meleuzovsky District